Brendon Burns is a former Labour Party Member of Parliament for the Christchurch Central electorate in the Parliament of New Zealand.

Early life
Burns worked for 12 years in the Parliamentary Press Gallery. As editor of The Marlborough Express for seven years, he led various community initiatives and won the country's top journalism award – a term at Cambridge University. He twice stood in the Kaikoura seat for Labour. He has an extensive career history in journalism having done political coverage in both print and radio mediums. He has run his own communications business Indaba Communications.

In 1999 he won the Qantas Award for best editorial writer.

Member of Parliament

Burns was selected to replace Tim Barnett who retired at the 2008 general election. In 2008, Burns successfully held Christchurch Central for Labour, with a greatly reduced majority of 935. In 2011, Burns lost the seat to National's Nicky Wagner by 47 votes.

He was Labour's spokesman for broadcasting, and was a member of the environmental team.

In September 2010, Burns' Environment Canterbury (Democracy Restoration) Amendment Bill was drawn from the member's ballot. The bill would reverse the government's replacement of the Canterbury Regional Council with unelected commissioners and force a special election to be held.  The Bill lapsed due to aging and the Government proceeded with a renewal of the terms of the initial Bill.

References

External links 
Official website
Page at Parliament website
Burns quits politics

New Zealand Labour Party MPs
Living people
New Zealand MPs for Christchurch electorates
Unsuccessful candidates in the 2011 New Zealand general election
Unsuccessful candidates in the 2002 New Zealand general election
Unsuccessful candidates in the 2005 New Zealand general election
Members of the New Zealand House of Representatives
New Zealand journalists
New Zealand editors
New Zealand magazine editors
21st-century New Zealand politicians
Year of birth missing (living people)